Sharon Lee is an American Democratic politician from New York City. From January 2020 until December 2020, she served as the acting borough president of Queens.

Political career 
Lee was appointed deputy borough president in November 2018. Lee took over as borough president from Melinda Katz in January 2020, who was elected Queens District Attorney in 2019. Lee oversaw the borough's response to the COVID-19 pandemic in New York City. Lee opposes cuts in healthcare spending. She did not run for reelection.

References 

Living people
Queens borough presidents
Women in New York (state) politics
New York (state) Democrats
Politicians from New York City
People from Queens, New York
American women of Korean descent in politics
Asian-American people in New York (state) politics
21st-century American politicians
21st-century American women politicians
Year of birth missing (living people)